The Polytechnic University of the Philippines is a state university in the Philippines.

Branches and Campuses
Central Luzon
Polytechnic University of the Philippines, Bataan
Polytechnic University of the Philippines, Cabiao
Polytechnic University of the Philippines, Pulilan
Polytechnic University of the Philippines, Santa Maria

Southern Luzon
Polytechnic University of the Philippines, Bansud
Polytechnic University of the Philippines, Biñan
Polytechnic University of the Philippines, Calauan
Polytechnic University of the Philippines, General Luna
Polytechnic University of the Philippines, Lopez
Polytechnic University of the Philippines, Maragondon
Polytechnic University of the Philippines, Mulanay
Polytechnic University of the Philippines, Ragay
Polytechnic University of the Philippines, Sablayan
Polytechnic University of the Philippines, San Pedro
Polytechnic University of the Philippines, Santa Rosa
Polytechnic University of the Philippines, Santo Tomas
Polytechnic University of the Philippines, Unisan

Metro Manila
Polytechnic University of the Philippines (Mabini, M.H. del Pilar, and NDC Campuses)
Polytechnic University of the Philippines, Parañaque
Polytechnic University of the Philippines, Quezon City
Polytechnic University of the Philippines, San Juan
Polytechnic University of the Philippines, Taguig

Other unrelated institutions with "University of the Philippines" on their titles
 Adventist University of the Philippines, a private coeducational Christian university
 Technological University of the Philippines, the flagship technology education university of the Philippines
 University of the Philippines, the national university of the Philippines (see disambiguation page)